Lochmaeocles pulcher is a species of beetle in the family Cerambycidae. It was described by Dillon and Dillon in 1946. It is known from Brazil, Ecuador, Peru and French Guiana.

References

pulcher
Beetles described in 1946